Terezín is a town in Litoměřice District in the Ústí nad Labem Region of the Czech Republic. It has about 2,800 inhabitants. It is a former military fortress composed of the citadel and adjacent walled garrison town. The town centre is well preserved and is protected by law as an urban monument reservation. Terezin is most infamously the location of the Nazis' notorious Theresienstadt Ghetto.

Administrative parts
Villages of České Kopisty, Nové Kopisty and Počaply are administrative parts of Terezín.

Geography
It lies in a flat landscape of the Lower Eger Table. It is situated on both banks of the Ohře River, near its confluence with the Elbe. The Elbe forms the northern municipal border.

History

On 10 January 1780, the Habsburg emperor Joseph II ordered the erection of the fortress, named Theresienstadt after his mother Empress Maria Theresa. In the times of Austria–Prussia rivalry, it was meant to secure the bridges across the Ohře and Elbe rivers against Prussian troops invading the Bohemian lands from neighbouring Saxony. Simultaneously, Josefov Fortress (Josephstadt) was erected near Jaroměř as a protection against Prussian attacks.

Construction of Theresienstadt started at the westernmost cavalier on 10 October 1780 and lasted ten years. The fortress consisted of a citadel, the "Small Fortress" (Kleine Festung), to the east of the Ohře, and a walled town, the "Main Fortress" (Große Festung), to the west. In peacetime it held 5,655 soldiers, and in wartime around 11,000 soldiers could be placed here. Trenches and low-lying areas around the fortress could be flooded for defensive purposes. Garrison church in the Main Fortress was designed by Heinrich Hatzinger, Julius D’Andreis and Franz Joseph Fohmann.

The fortress was never under direct siege. During the Austro-Prussian War, on 28 July 1866, part of the garrison attacked and destroyed an important railway bridge near Neratovice (rail line Turnov – Kralupy nad Vltavou) that was shortly before repaired by the Prussians. This attack occurred two days after Austria and Prussia had agreed to make peace, but the Theresienstadt garrison was ignorant of the news.

During the second half of the 19th century, the fortress was also used as a prison. During World War I, the fortress was used as a political prison camp. Many thousand supporters of Russia (Ukrainian Russophiles from Galicia and Bukovina) were placed by Austro-Hungarian authorities in the fortress. Gavrilo Princip, who assassinated Franz Ferdinand, Archduke of Austria and his wife, died there of tuberculosis in 1918.

With the collapse of the Austro-Hungarian Empire in 1918, the town became part of the newly formed state of Czechoslovakia. It was located in an area with a high proportion of ethnic Germans in the population, known as the Sudetenland. Nazi Germany used this population of ethnic Germans as a rationale for expansion of the borders of the Fatherland. In 1938, it annexed the Sudetenland. It then followed in 1939 by occupying the rest of Bohemia, and the Moravia part of Czechoslovakia.

World War II

After the Munich Agreement in September 1938 and following the occupation of the Czech lands in March 1939, with the existing prisons gradually filled up as a result of the Nazi terror, the Prague Gestapo Police prison was set up in the Small Fortress (see History) in 1940. The first inmates arrived on 14 June 1940. By the end of the war 32,000 prisoners of whom 5,000 were women passed through the Small Fortress. These were primarily Czechs, later other nationals, for instance citizens of the former Soviet Union, Poles, Germans, and Yugoslavs. Most of the prisoners were arrested for various acts of resistance to the Nazi regime; among them were the family members and supporters of the assassins of Reinhard Heydrich. Many prisoners were later sent to concentration camps such as Mauthausen.  The Jewish Ghetto was created in 1941.

By 1940, Germany assigned the Gestapo to adapt Terezín, better known by the German name Theresienstadt, as a ghetto and concentration camp. Considerable work was done in the next two years to adapt the complex for the dense overcrowding that inmates would be subjected to. It held primarily Jews from Czechoslovakia, as well as tens of thousands of Jews deported chiefly from Germany and Austria, as well as hundreds from the Netherlands and Denmark. More than 150,000 Jews were sent there, including 15,000 children.

Although it was not an extermination camp, about 33,000 died in the ghetto. This was mostly due to the appalling conditions arising out of extreme population density, malnutrition and disease. About 88,000 inhabitants were deported to Auschwitz and the other extermination camps. As late as the end of 1944, the Germans were still deporting Jews to the death camps. At the end of the war, there were 17,247 survivors of Theresienstadt (including some who had survived the death camps).

Part of the fortification (Small Fortress) served as the largest Gestapo prison in the Protectorate of Bohemia and Moravia. It was on the other side of the river from the ghetto and operated separately. Around 90,000 people went through it, and 2,600 died there.

The complex was taken over for operation by the International Red Cross on 2 May 1945, with the Commander and SS guards fleeing within the next two days. Some were later captured. The camp and prison were liberated on 9 May 1945 by the Soviet Army.

After World War II
After the German surrender the small fortress was used as an internment camp for ethnic Germans. The first prisoners arrived on 10 May 1945. On 29 February 1948 the last German prisoners were released and the camp was officially closed.

Among the interned Germans were former Nazis like Heinrich Jöckel, the former commander of Terezín and other SS members. A great group of internees was arrested because of their German nationality, among them young boys and elderly people.

In the first phase of the camp lasting until July 1945 mortality was high due to diseases, malnutrition and incidents of simple outright murder. Commander of the camp in that period was Stanislav Franc. He was guided by a spirit of revenge and tolerated arbitrary mistreatment of the prisoners by the guards.

In July 1945 the camp shifted under the control of the Czech Ministry for Domestic Affairs. The new commander appointed was Otakar Kálal. From then on the inmates were gradually transferred to Germany and Terezín was increasingly used as a hub for the forced migration of Germans from the Czech lands into Germany proper.

Modern history

After the related war uses, the government retained a military garrison until 1996.

In 2002 the town was struck by floods during which the crematorium was damaged. According to the Fund, a long-term conservation plan was conceived, which includes further repairs, documentation, and archaeological research.

In mid-April 2008, 327 bronze grave markers were stolen from the Jewish cemetery; another 700 were stolen the following week. The high price of metal encouraged the vandalizing thieves. Some grave markers were recovered.

Economy
The troops' departure and closing down of related operations had a negative effect on the local economy of the town.

Terezín is still trying to develop a more diverse economy; its history can attract heritage tourism. Terezín is noted for its production of furniture and knitwear, as well as for manufacturing.

Sights

Terezín Fortress is one of the most visited memorial sites in Central Europe. In 2002, the fortress, which was in a deteriorated condition, was listed in the 2002 World Monuments Watch by the World Monuments Fund. The organization called for a comprehensive conservation plan, while providing funding for emergency repairs from American Express. A conservation plan was eventually developed in cooperation with national authorities.

The town provides many museums, most of them reflect its history. Terezín Memorial include:
Small Fortress;
Ghetto Museum;
National Cemetery;
Memorial on the bank of the Ohře River;
Park of the Terezín Children;
Former Magdeburg Barracks;
Jewish Prayer Room;
Railway siding;
Columbarium;
Ceremonial Halls and the Central Morgue of the Ghetto;
Jewish Cemetery and the Crematorium;
Cemetery of Soviet soldiers.

Other museums include:
Museum of Franz Joseph I of Austria;
Cavalier 2 with an exhibition of lives of soldiers in the 18th century;
Museum of Nostalgy with an exhibition of things from the socialist era of the country;
La Grace Museum in the Cavalier 2 complex;
Geocaching Museum in the Cavalier 2 complex;
Sappeur Corps Museum;
Museum of road bicycle racing.

Notable people
Alexander Ypsilantis (1792–1828), leader of the Greek revolution of 1821
Pauline Metzler-Löwy (1853–1921), Austrian contralto singer
Gavrilo Princip (1894–1918), the assassin of Franz Ferdinand, died here in imprisonment
Zuzana Růžičková (1927–2017), harpsichordist

Twin towns – sister cities

Terezín is twinned with:
 Dębno, Poland
 Komárno, Slovakia
 Strausberg, Germany

Representation in other media
 Waiting for Leah (1992), a novel by Arnošt Lustig set in the fortress in 1944 describing the last few days before the deportation to the east of the 17-year-old narrator, as the Germans are in a hurry to complete their final solution. The author was sent by the Nazis to Terezín in 1942, then to Auschwitz and Buchenwald, which he survived.
 I Never Saw Another Butterfly (1994), a collection of works of art and poetry by Jewish children who lived in the concentration camp Theresienstadt. This book is named after a 1942 poem by Pavel Friedmann (born 1921) who was incarcerated at Theresienstadt and was later killed at Auschwitz. Where known, the fate of each young author is listed.
 In Austerlitz (2001) by W. G. Sebald the eponymous character's mother is deported to the ghetto in Terezín, before being later sent east, where she perished at another camp.
 And A Child Shall Lead (2005), a play by American writer Michael Slade, takes place in Terezín concentration camp during World War II, specifically 1942–1945. The play revolves around eight Jewish children, from ages six to fifteen, who create a secret newspaper to tell the world what is happening behind the camp's walls.
 In The Lost Wife (2011), a novel by Alyson Richman, one of the main characters, Lenka, is transported to Terezín concentration camp during World War II.
 Czech novelist Ivan Klíma describes his childhood time in the Terezín ghetto in his autobiography, My Crazy Century (2013).
 Born Survivors (2015), a novel by Wendy Holden tells of three young mothers and their extraordinary story of courage, defiance and hope.

Gallery

References

External links

 (in Czech)
Official tourist portal (in English)
Fortress Details
A Visit to Terezín, an article from Think Prague Magazine with pictures
Fortress details (in Czech)
Terezín Memorial

 
Cities and towns in the Czech Republic
Forts in the Czech Republic
Populated places in Litoměřice District
World War II sites in the Czech Republic
Populated places established in the 1780s